Sir George Beresford-Stooke  (3 January 1897 – 7 April 1983) – always known as "Toby" - was Chief Secretary to Northern Rhodesia, and later appointed Governor of Sierra Leone from September, 1947 until December 1952.

Beresford-Stooke was born on 3 January 1897 in Priors Marston, Warwickshire. On 15 January 1914 (just after his 17th birthday) he enrolled in the Royal Navy, with the rank of Paymaster Lieutenant.

After the end of the First World War, he joined his Majesty's Overseas Civil Service (HMOCS), serving in Sarawak, Kenya, Mauritius, Zanzibar, and as Chief Secretary of Northern Rhodesia and then of Nigeria.

He married Creenagh Lydia L. Richards, and in 1944 
they adopted Peter, and later, Cara, both from South Africa.

Governor of Sierra Leone (September 1947 – December 1952) 

While Governor of Sierra Leone, he was also Chief Scout of that country. His time as governor corresponded with a troubling rise of the Crocodile Society in rural parts of the country.

In 1951, Sir George revised the Constitution of Sierra Leone to expand the franchise to women in areas of the "interior" where, up until that point, only men were allowed the right-to-vote on local matters.  Beresford-Stooke ordered government resources to go towards building health clinics and repairing roads on Tasso, Kagbeli, and Tumbu Islands which had long been overlooked by the government.  Each island had a small handful of facilities run by the British government, however those facilities were all racially segregated into "European" and "African" sections.  Beresford-Stooke ordered all of those facilities to be desegregated, and all new facilities to be built without racial segregation in mind with respects to new structures.  In the city of Bo, local indigenous leaders requested more funds for school building and road repairs, Beresford-Stooke succeeded in getting those funds allocated and having the repairs completed before leaving office.  Beresford-Stooke also requested and received help in increasingly "rural literacy" programs in the colony's interior. He ordered that signs which had hitherto only been painted in English, also be painted in the Sherbro, Mende and Temne languages so that locals who did not speak English were able to read them.  Sir Milton Margai later said that if more colonial administrators "had been like Beresford-Stooke, Hodson, Wilkinson and Ransford Slater, colonialism would have had a better reputation.  However, most simply were not."
 
He retired from HMOCS in 1952, aged 55 (the normal retirement age for that Service at that time).

Retirement 

Retiring to East Molesey, Surrey, Sir George became Second Crown Agent for the Colonies. He served as Treasurer to the International African Institute, 1955–1965, and as Vice-Chairman, 1957–1974.

In 1954, after six months as Assistant, Sir George, having been a Scout for many years, was appointed Overseas Commissioner for the Boy Scout Association

Also in 1954, Sir George was appointed a Knight of the Order of St. John of Jerusalem.   His portrait is in the National Portrait Gallery

In 1959, Sir George was part of a team tasked by UK to investigate the detention camps in Kenya.

Sir George was a Gentleman Usher of the Blue Rod, 1959–1972.

Sir George and Creenagh later moved to Hillfarance, west of Taunton, Somerset, where he died on 7 April 1983.  He lies buried in the Churchyad of the Parish Church of the Holy Cross at Hillfarrance.  His wife Creenagh (born 14 May 1907) also died there, in November 1998.

See also 

Index of Sierra Leone–related articles
Hannah Benka-Coker

References 

1897 births
1952 deaths
Governors of Sierra Leone
Knights Commander of the Order of St Michael and St George
Royal Navy officers
Royal Navy officers of World War I
Chief Secretaries of Northern Rhodesia
Chief Secretaries of Nigeria
People from Warwickshire
People from Molesey
People from Somerset
Royal Navy logistics officers
British expatriates in Northern Rhodesia